Wando Tower is a 76m tall observation tower built in 'Dadohae Ilchul Gongwon(Hangul:다도해 일출 공원)' ('Archipelago Sunrise Park'; with an area of about 53,000 m2) near the top of Dongmangsan Mountain located at 330 Jangbogodae-ro, Wando-eup, Wando-gun, Jeollanam-do. The tower is 2F plus the observation floor. Completed in September 2008, Wando Tower is a tourist spot from which visitors can get a full view of the sunrise and sunset on the archipelago and appreciate the night view of Wando including Wando Port and Sinji Daegyo ('bridge') all the year round.

The ground floor of the tower a local specialties exhibition hall, Chroma key photo zone, area to rest, and a video facility that presents various visuals symbolizing the Wando (island)

The second floor has image bench, photo zone, and people of Wando County, with an observation deck where visitors can take pictures.

On the observation floor at the height of 51.4m, video monitors and binoculars are in place to provide a view of the beautiful vista on the archipelago. Enabling tourists to view Cheongsando, Bogildo, Nohwado, Soando, Sinjido, and Gogeumdo, they allow viewers to observe Jeju Island and Geomundo on a clear day.

References

External links
 Wando Tower
 Wando County Tourist

Counties of South Jeolla Province